Mario Villanueva (born March 7, 1989) is a Belizean professional defender currently playing for Georgetown Ibayani.

External links
 

1989 births
Living people
Belizean footballers
Belize international footballers
Georgetown Ibayani FC players
Association football defenders